Himatina is a replacement name for Himatella, Bergh, 1890, a genus of sea slugs, specifically aeolid nudibranchs, marine gastropod molluscs in the family Coryphellidae.

Species 
Species within the genus Himatina are as follows:
 Himatina trophina (Bergh, 1890)

References

Coryphellidae
Gastropod genera